Liverpool 1 can refer to:

Places 

Liverpool One - shopping centre opened in 2008.
Liverpool 1 - postal district.

Media 

Liverpool 1 (TV series) - a 1998 television series following a fictional Merseyside vice squad.